Villem Tomiste (born 8 August 1975 in Tallinn) is an Estonian architect.

He graduated from high school in 1993 Tallinna Liivalaia Gümnaasium. Tomiste was enrolled as a student of the Tallinn University of Technology the same year. The architectural degree was acquired in Estonian Academy of Arts from 1994 to 2000.

He worked as an editor for the daily newspaper Post from 1993 to 1997. Tomiste also was part of the pop/rap-group Must Q for two years since 1995. From 2000 till 2002 he practiced as a freelance architect. Since 2002 he is a partner in architectural office KOSMOS. In 2012 office name was changed into Stuudio Tallinn.

He is best known for his wide range of completed works and polemical/published interventions concerning the subject of urbanity and city-life. The completed works include: the Central Square for the Town of Rakvere; apartment buildings in Laagri; a mixed-use city-block in Rotermanni Quarter in the City of Tallinn and the apartment building with retail space in the Old Town part in the City of Tallinn.  The best known speculative propositions are the vision for the Viru Square in Tallinn, as a pedestrian area free of car-traffic (2004) and alternative visions for the spire of the church of the Holy Ghost in Tallinn, which was destroyed in fire (2002). The built and envisioned spaces and structures created with Ott Kadarik and Mihkel Tüür (architectural office KOSMOS) are distinctive for playful use of materials, their dramatic spatial language and hypermodern layout of volumes. Next to the built edifices and philanthropic urban proposals he has successfully participated in multiple local and international competitions. He was awarded with Urban Studies Prize by the Cultural Endowment of Estonia in 2003 and as part of the architectural practice KOSMOS he won the Estonian Republic’s national Cultural Advancement Award for the city-block in Rotermanni Quarter in 2008.

Villem Tomiste is a member of the Union of Estonian Architects since 2001 and Member of Chair of the Union of Estonian Architects since 2002. Since 2010 Villem Tomiste is Vice-Chairman of The Union of Estonian Architects. He was also part of the Architectural Council for the Tallinn City Centre from 2005 to 2006. In 2011 he organized first Tallinn Architecture Biennale with Estonian Architecture Center.

Selected projects
Reconstruction of the Steiner garden in Pärnu, 2001 (with Veronika Valk)
Alternative vision for the spire of the church of the Holy Ghost in Tallinn, 2002 (with Ott Kadarik, Mihkel Tüür)
Apartment buildings in Laagri, 2003 (with Ott Kadarik, Mihkel Tüür)
Central square of Rakvere, 2004 (with Ott Kadarik, Mihkel Tüür, Veronika Valk)
Alternative vision for the Viru Square, 2004 (with Ott Kadarik, Mihkel Tüür)
Duplexes on Põdrakanepi Street, 2005 (with Ott Kadarik, Mihkel Tüür)
Rotermanni Quarter, 2007 (with Ott Kadarik, Mihkel Tüür)
Apartment building Aiamaja in the Old Town of Tallinn, 2009 (with Ott Kadarik, Mihkel Tüür)

Competitions
1997	Modular kiosk architectural competition; I prize
1998	Vabaduse square planning competition (with Ott Kadarik); runner-up
1999   Rakvere center planning competition (with Ott Kadarik, Veronika Valk); I prize
1999	Kaali meteorite museum architectural competition (with Veronika Valk); II prize
1999	Võru central area planning competition (with Ott Kadarik, Veronika Valk); honorary prize
2000	Lasnamäe sports hall architectural competition (with Veronika Valk); honorable mention
2000	Lasnamäe sports hall architectural competition (with Ott Kadarik, Veronika Valk); runner-up
2000	Tartu ecological building architectural competition (with Veronika Valk); I honorary prize
2000	Tartu ecological building architectural competition (with Veronika Valk); II honorary prize
2000	Tallinn coastal area planning competition (with Veronika Valk); I prize
2000	Tallinn School No. 21 architectural competition (with Veronika Valk); III prize
2000	Munamäe skiing center architectural competition (with Veronika Valk); III prize
2000	Võru central square architectural competition (with Veronika Valk); I-II prize
2000	Pärnu Sütevaka Private High School gymnasium architectural competition (with Veronika Valk); honorary prize
2000	Põlva central area planning competition (with Ott Kadarik, Veronika Valk); honorary prize
2001	Suurejaani High School architectural competition (with Veronika Valk); I prize
2001	Narva Peetri square planning competition (with Veronika Valk); III prize
2001	Steiner garden landscape competition võistlus (with Veronika Valk); I prize
2002	Narva, Tallinna and Kangelaste intersection planning competition; III prize 	
2002	Tallinn, Admiraliteed Bassein, planning competition; I prize 	
2002	Tallinn, Vanasadam, planning competition; I prize  	
2002	Mustjõe planning competition (with Ott Kadarik, Mihkel Tüür); I prize
2002	Kalev candy factory planning competition (with Ott Kadarik, Mihkel Tüür); honorary prize
2003	Tallinn, Aia st.4 architectural competition (with Ott Kadarik, Mihkel Tüür); I prize
2003	Tartu, Emajõe planning competition (with Ott Kadarik, Mihkel Tüür); III prize
2003	Riga, Ķīpsala planning competition (with Ott Kadarik, Mihkel Tüür); honorary prize
2003	Tallinn, Linnahall architectural competition (with Ott Kadarik, Mihkel Tüür); I-II prize
2003	Pärnu gymnasium architectural competition (with Mihkel Tüür); III prize
2003	Marati quarter architectural competition (with Ott Kadarik, Mihkel Tüür, Paco Ulman); I prize
2003	Paadi st. hotel hotelliarchitectural competition (with Tomomi Hayashi, Ott Kadarik, Mihkel Tüür); I prize
2003	Viimsi High School architectural competition (with Ott Kadarik, Mihkel Tüür); honorary prize
2004	Rottermanni quarter architectural competition (with Ott Kadarik, Mihkel Tüür); I prize
2004	Tartu Fortuuna quarter architectural competition (with Ott Kadarik, Mihkel Tüür); III prize
2004	Viljandi cemetery chapel architectural competition (with Ott Kadarik, Mihkel Tüür); honorary prize
2005	Tartu, Mõisavahe planning competition (with Ott Kadarik, Mihkel Tüür); I prize
2005	Tallinn, Pritsumaja quarter architectural competition (with Ott Kadarik, Mihkel Tüür); I prize
2005	Estonian National Museum architectural competition (with Ott Kadarik, Urmas Oja, Krista Saluveer, Mihkel Tüür); honorary prize
2005	Riga, Klīversala island planning competition (with Ott Kadarik, Mihkel Tüür); honorary prize
2005	Skoone Bastion planning competition (with Ott Kadarik, Mihkel Tüür, Paco Ulman); III prize
2006	Kiviõli, central square landscape competition (with Ott Kadarik, Mihkel Tüür, Kaiko Kivi); honorary prize
2006	Maakri quarter planning competition (with Ott Kadarik, Mihkel Tüür); honorary prize
2006	Juhkentali quarter architectural competition (with Ott Kadarik, Mihkel Tüür); I prize
2006	Paide gymnasium architectural competition (with Ott Kadarik, Mihkel Tüür); II prize
2006	Pärnu, Jõeäärse planning competition (with Ott Kadarik, Mihkel Tüür); III prize
2006	Tallinna Tehnikaülikool Library architectural competition (with Ott Kadarik); III prize
2007	Tallinn, Patarei area planning competition (with Ott Kadarik); III prize
2007	Paide Vocational Training Centre arhitektuurivõistlus architectural competition (with Ott Kadarik, Mihkel Tüür); I prize
2007	Tamsalu central area planning competition (with Ott Kadarik, Mihkel Tüür); III prize
2007	Estonian Open Air Museum architectural competition (with Ott Kadarik, Mihkel Tüür); honorary prize
2008	Estonian University of Life Sciences architectural competition; honorary prize
2008	Tallinn Pirita st. 26 architectural competition (with Ott Kadarik); I-II prize
2008	Viljandi Culture Academy architectural competition (with Reedik Poo-Puu, Mihkel Tüür); honorary prize
2008	Tallinn, the Museum of Estonian Architecture, landscape competition; I prize 	
2009	Kultuurikatel architectural competition (with Ott Kadarik, Mihkel Tüür); III prize
2009	Hoolekandeküla architectural competition (with Ott Kadarik); honorary prize
2009	Institute of Physics, University of Tartuarchitectural competition (with Ott Kadarik); I-III prize
2009	Institute of Physics, University of Tartuarchitectural competition (with Ott Kadarik); I-III prize
2009	Tartu Maraton, monument competition; honorary prize

Exhibitions
2003 Vision for Pirita st., Tallinn, Arhitektuuri- ja Disainigalerii
2004 Viru Plats 2008, Tallinn, Arhitektuuri- ja Disainigalerii
2004 Collage Europa, Rotterdam, NAI
2005 Emerging Identities, Berlin, DAZ
2006 Skaalanihe – skulptuur avatud mänguväljal, Tallinn, KUMU
2006 Raine Karp, isikunäituse koostamine ja kujundus, Tallinn, The Museum of Estonian Architecture
2008 FOR THE ROAD - EUROPEAN DESIGN TOUR, Budapest, Design Terminál Kht.
2008 BOOM/ROOM NEW ESTONIAN ARCHITECTURE, Tallinn, The Museum of Estonian Architecture
2011 Borders of architecture 2: housing,  Louisiana Museum of Modern Art, Denmark
2011 11FLIRTS – Curator exhibition of the TAB Tallinn Architecture Biennale, Kadriorg Palace, Tallinn
2012 EIGHT EIGHTS / KAHEKSA KAHEKSAT, Tallinn, The Museum of Estonian Architecture

References
Superdisain Rakvere keskväljakul
Veskitammi kortermajad Laagris
Rotermanni saaga
Seitse Eesti ehitist Euroopa arhitektuuripreemia jahil
Eesti Arhitektide Liidu liikmed
Noore Arhitekti Preemia nominendid

External links
KOSMOS
Union of Estonian Architects

1975 births
Living people
Tallinn University of Technology alumni
Architects from Tallinn